Nameless Heroes (German:Namenlose Helden) is a 1925 German silent film directed by Curtis Bernhardt. Only a fragment of the film still survives. It was made by the Communist-controlled Prometheus Film.

Cast
In alphabetical order
 Marga Becker 
 Max Grünberg 
 Annemarie Hase 
 Heinz Hilpert as Munitionsfabrikant
 Hermann Hoffmann 
 Erwin Kalser as Scholz
 Ernst Pittschau 
 Lili Schoenborn-Anspach as Frau Scholz
 Karl Siebrecht 
 Martha Tiedt 
 Irma von Cube
 Max von Schwarzenberg

References

Bibliography
 Ashkenazi, Ofer. Weimar Film and Modern Jewish Identity. Palgrave Macmillan, 2012.

External links

1925 films
Films of the Weimar Republic
Films directed by Curtis Bernhardt
German silent feature films
German black-and-white films
Lost German films